J. John Priola is a contemporary visual artist who uses photography and video. He is known for working with a highly refined print quality and presentation of black and white photography but works with the digital medium and video as well. He is based in San Francisco. He graduated from Metropolitan State College in Denver and went on the receive an MFA from the San Francisco Art Institute. His work first gained recognition at the Fraenkel Gallery and has been the subject of numerous solo exhibitions at Gallery Paule Anglim in San Francisco, then Anglim Gilbert Gallery, and now Anglim/Trimble Gallery.

Priola's work has been included in numerous exhibitions, including In A Different Light: Visual Culture, Sexual Identity, Queer Practice at the Berkeley Art Museum and Pacific Film Archive, and his work has been featured in articles such as "John Priola: Photo series explores 'Philanthropy'"  and in publications such as Art Papers Magazine. Other major exhibitions include, "La Natura Della Natura Morta" Galleria D'art Moderna, Bologna and "Prospect '96" at the Schirn Kunsthalle, Frankfurt, Germany. His work was part of a five-year traveling exhibition “Picturing Eden” launching from the George Eastman House/International Museum of Photography and Film. He is the recipient of awards and commissions such as the Artadia Award, a Svane Family Foundation Commission, the John Anson Kittredge Fund, Aaron Siskind Foundation and the California Arts Council. In 1998, a monograph was published on three bodies of his work, Once Removed, Portraits by J. John Priola.

He has taught at the International Center of Photography Bard MFA program, Hartford Art School International Limited Residency MFA Photography Program, California College of the Arts, and San Francisco State University. For 25 years he taught at the San Francisco Art Institute where he served as interim chair of the photography department, was Faculty Trustee to the Board, and was Director of the Low-Residency MFA Program in Studio Art. He is represented by the Anglim/Trimble Gallery  (Anglim/Trimble gallery, formerly Anglim Gilbert Gallery and Gallery Paule Anglim,) in San Francisco, Weston Gallery in Carmel, Schneider Gallery in Chicago, and the Joseph Bellows Gallery in La Jolla.

Collections

Art Institute of Chicago, IL 
Denver Art Museum, CO 
Art In Embassies USDepartment of State 
Honolulu Museum of Art, HI (formerly The Contemporary Museum) 
LA County Museum of Art, Los Angeles, CA 
Metropolitan Museum of Art, NY 
Museum of Fine Arts, Houston, TX 
Oakland Museum of Art, CA 
Philadelphia Museum of Art, PA 
San Francisco Museum of Modern Art, CA 
University Art Museum, Berkeley, CA

References

External links

Hartford Art School MFA
ICP Bard MFA faculty
Librarything.com Once Removed: Portraits by J. John Priola
Outside the window a watcher in the dark
Picturing Eden
Archive Viumgraphy: J. John Priola

Photographers from California
1960 births
Living people